Bizlan (also, Biznan) is a village and municipality in the Ismailli Rayon of Azerbaijan.  It has a population of 480.  The municipality consists of the villages of Bizlan and Zərgəran.

References 

Populated places in Ismayilli District